Kew is a suburb and ward of Southport, a seaside town in Sefton, Merseyside, England. It makes up the southeastern edge of the town, bordering Scarisbrick in West Lancashire. It is a middle class area of mostly modern development, and one of Southport's smallest suburbs.

History
The area was originally a 12-acre garden and zoological site in the 1880s, named after Kew Gardens in Surrey. Visitors to Southport would travel via horse tram to enjoy the gardens, pavilion and lake which had gondoliers. Parts of the lake and gardens still survive. Modern-day Kew is a mid-late 20th century housing estate close to the Hospital which was built on Blowick Moss and also former playing fields. The roads are mainly named after horse racing venues.

Local amenities
The area is served by a number of 'out of town' shopping complexes, Kew retail park, and the Meols Cop retail park (not in Kew, but Blowick) and a large Tesco. There is also a number of pubs, including Hickory's Smokehouse, The Richmond and The Old Duke. There is a school, Kew woods, the towns main Hospital and Queenscourt Hospice. A Church dedicated to St Francis of Assisi can also be found in Kew.

Transport
Kew was served by Kew Gardens railway station on the Liverpool, Southport and Preston Junction Railway from 1 November 1887 to 26 September 1938. The nearest station is Meols Cop on the Manchester to Southport line. Kew is also served by buses to Liverpool and Ormskirk.

References

Southport
Towns and villages in the Metropolitan Borough of Sefton